KNED 1150 AM is a radio station licensed to McAlester, Oklahoma.  The station broadcasts a Classic Country format and is owned by Southeastern Oklahoma Radio, LLC.

Translators

References

External links
KNED's website

NED
Classic country radio stations in the United States